Dash Bolagh (also Romanized as Dāsh Bolāgh; also known as Dāsh Būlāq) is a village in Zarrineh Rud Rural District, Bizineh Rud District, Khodabandeh County, Zanjan Province, Iran. At the 2006 census, its population was 446, in 84 families.

References 

Populated places in Khodabandeh County